Mykola Semyonovich Samokish (translit.: Nikolay Semyonovich Samokish; 25 October 1860, Nizhyn, Chernihiv, Russian Empire - 18 January 1944, Simferopol, USSR) was a Ukrainian and Soviet painter and illustrator of Ukrainian Cossack descent who specialized in military art and animal painting. The artist contributed to the development of the Ukrainian national style in art at the end of the 19th and the beginning of the 20th century. 

Samokish is also known as the second husband of the book illustrator Elena Sudkovskaya, with whom he often collaborated.

Biography 
His father was a postman; probably of Hungarian ancestry. He spent his youth in Nosivka with the family of his maternal grandfather, who was a Cossack. Later, he graduated from Nezhin Lyceum of Prince Bezborodko. His first attempt to enroll at the St. Petersburg Academy of arts was unsuccessful, but he gained an endorsement from an associate of Professor Bogdan Willewalde, was admitted, and studied there from 1879 to 1885 with Mikhail Clodt and Valery Jacobi as well as Willewalde, and won several awards. His painting "Прогулка" (the Walk) was bought by Pavel Tretyakov.

From 1885 to 1888, he studied in Paris with Edouard Detaille. When he returned, he and Franz Roubaud travelled to the Caucasus to create some large works for a panorama at the military history museum of Tbilisi. In 1889, he married the well-known book illustrator, Elena Sudkovskaya. The following year, he was named an Academician. From 1894 to 1918, he taught at the Academy, where he became a Professor in 1913.

In 1904, on behalf of the magazine Niva, he travelled to the front during the Russo-Japanese War and produced an album of paintings. In 1915, he and some of his students at the Academy formed an "Art Squad" and went to the Eastern Front to make sketches. During the Russian Revolution, he became separated from his wife. She went to Paris and apparently died there in 1924, although some sources say she returned to Russia and died in Vyborg. 

In 1918, after the old Academy was abolished, he moved to Yalta with the Armed Forces of South Russia then, in 1922, to Simferopol, where he provided support to artistically talented youngsters and eventually organized an art school that received official state recognition. In 1934, he was given what would prove to be his largest commission: acting as managing consultant for a gigantic panorama depicting the Siege of Perekop. After 1936, he worked at the art institute in Kharkiv. 

Among the thousands of book illustrations he produced, perhaps the most notable are those for stories by Marko Vovchok, Mykola Dzherya by Ivan Nechuy-Levytsky, Taras Bulba by Nikolai Gogol and Imperial Hunting in Russia by Nikolai Kutepov. He and his wife worked together to illustrate Dead Souls and create murals for the Tsarskoye Selo railway station.

Shortly after the end of World War II, a major exhibition of his early works was held at his workshop in Kharkiv. He was the subject of a documentary film in 1966.

Selected paintings

References

Further reading 
 M. Burachek, Микола Самокиша (Ukrainian Painters series), Рух, 1930, Full text online
 Nina Lapidus, Николай Самокиш, Masters of Art series, Белый город, 2006
 V. Y. Tkachenko, H. С. Самокиш. Жизнь и творчество (life and works), Иск-во, 1964

External links 

 The Russo-Japanese War from Samokysh's diary @ Русское воскресение
 Вишуканий ілюстратор Микола Самокиш (Exquisite Illustrator, Mykola Samokysh) @ the Kharkiv Korolenko State Library website.
 Arcadja Auctions: More works by Samokysh
 

1860 births
1944 deaths
People from Nizhyn
People from Chernigov Governorate
19th-century Ukrainian painters
19th-century Ukrainian male artists
Ukrainian male painters
20th-century Ukrainian painters
20th-century Ukrainian male artists
Russian painters
Russian male painters
Russian war artists
Stalin Prize winners
19th-century war artists
20th-century war artists
Imperial Academy of Arts alumni
Full Members of the Imperial Academy of Arts